The Journal of Strategic Studies is a peer-reviewed academic journal covering military and diplomatic strategic studies. It was established in 1978 by Frank Cass & Co. with John Gooch (University of Leeds) as founding editor-in-chief. The current editors-in-chief are Joe Maiolo (King's College London) and Thomas G. Mahnken (Johns Hopkins University). It is currently published by Routledge.

According to the Journal Citation Reports, the journal has a 2017 impact factor of 1.671.

References

External links

Political science journals
English-language journals
Publications established in 1978
Routledge academic journals
Strategic studies
7 times per year journals